Frederick John Bahr (1837–1885) was an inventor from Baden-Wuerttemburg, Germany, who eventually settled on top of Wills Mountain in Cumberland, Maryland, United States.

A B&O Railroad magazine wrote an article noting that Frederick was "an eccentric German with indefatigable energy".  When Frederick opened a beer garden and bowling alley, he first built a railroad up the mountainside and had mules turning a pulley system at the top, which moved the railroad cars up the mountain, carrying tourists. But that was not sustainable, so he invented a type of cigar-shaped balloon/blimp to be filled with hydrogen which was made of fabric pieces sewn by Margaret, his wife, by hand.  Paddle wheels were on the sides and it had two cranks for propulsion windlass.  Although hydrogen was plentiful, it was very expensive, and Frederick sunk all his money into financing the gas.  Numerous newspaper accounts were made interviewing him, claiming he was secretly keeping his inventions in a cave in the Knobly Mountain of West Virginia, and that he applied for patents in New York.  One of his balloons was destroyed by fire as it was being filled with hydrogen.  Another was supposedly cut to pieces by some of his enemies who thought he was crazy.  Another was taken away suddenly by a terrible wind. 

It was advertised in the Cumberland Times that a balloon exhibition would be held in the Cumberland City ball park on October, 1885.  But there was no newspaper follow up on what ever transpired after that date - whether success or failure - or even if he was injured in the trial.        

Before his unknown demise, he might have worked as a laborer in West Virginia, but nonetheless, he lived alone in his last years, and is buried in an unmarked grave somewhere on Mt. Savage.  

See also other photos including Lover's Leap, and the log cabin homestead (painted in 1878 by daughter, Norma Bahr) at www.findagrave.com / search non-famous/frederick john bahr.

1837 births
1885 deaths

German emigrants to the United States
People from Cumberland, Maryland
American inventors